Stanley Charles Sayer (2 February 1895 – 3 April 1982) was an English footballer who scored 51 goals from 201 appearances in the Football League playing for Millwall Athletic, Tranmere Rovers, New Brighton, Wigan Borough, Lincoln City and Southend United. He played as a centre forward or inside forward. He also played non-league football for Ramsgate Town, Northfleet and Dartford.

References

1895 births
1982 deaths
Sportspeople from Chatham, Kent
Footballers from Kent
English footballers
Association football forwards
Ramsgate F.C. players
Millwall F.C. players
Northfleet United F.C. players
Tranmere Rovers F.C. players
New Brighton A.F.C. players
Wigan Borough F.C. players
Lincoln City F.C. players
Southend United F.C. players
Dartford F.C. players
English Football League players
Southern Football League players
Place of death missing